Dragon Knight or The Dragon Knight may refer to:

 Dragon Knight (novel series), a series of fantasy novels by Gordon R. Dickson which began in 1976.
 The Dragon Knight (Dickson novel), the second novel in the Dragon Knight series, released in 1990
 Dragon Knight (video game series), a series of hentai games by ELF, and (mostly hentai) anime based on those games
 Dragon Knight (video game), a 1989 video game
 Dragon Knight II, an MSX game released December 1990
 Dragon Knight III or Knights of Xentar, a 1991 multi-platform game
 Dragon Knight 4, a 1994 game
 Dragon Knight, a 1990 adventure scenario published for the Dragonlance campaign setting in the Dungeons & Dragons roleplaying game
 Kamen Rider: Dragon Knight, a 2009 television series adapted from Kamen Rider Ryuki
 The Dragon Knight (film), a 2011 Chinese animated film
 The Dragon Knight (Owen novel),  a standalone eighth novel in The Chronicles of the Imaginarium Geographica series, released in 2020

See also
 Dragon Knights, a 1990–2007 fantasy manga series by Mineko Ohkami